MLA Mani: Patham Classum Gusthiyum is a 2012 Indian Malayalam film directed by Sreejith Paleri and had Kalabhavan Mani, Lena and Vidya in the lead roles.

Cast 
 Kalabhavan Mani as Manikandan
 Siddique as Benjamin Martin
 Lena as MLA Lakshmi Priya
 Vidhya Mohan as Meeenakshi
 Sadhika Venugopal as Parvathy
 Abu Salim as Govindan
 Babu Namboothiri as Abdullah Mash
 Harisree Ashokan as Pushkaran
 Vijayaraghavan as Vattakkadan Varkey
 Shammi Thilakan as Amir Hussain
 Kalabhavan Shajohn as Neelakandan
 Chembil Ashokan as Minister Kasim Haji
 Ambika Mohan as MLA Lakshmi Priya's mother
 Nisha Sarang
 Manjusha Sajish aka Manju Raghavan as Akhila

Songs

Reception 
A critic from The Times of India gave the film a rating of two out of five stars and said that "MLA Mani Patham Classum Gusthiyum will bring more joy to Kalabhavan Mani than any of the other films, in which he has played the lead, have. Hardly a single frame in the movie goes without Mani".

References

External links

2012 films
2010s Malayalam-language films